Janis: Her Life and Music is a 2019 book by Holly George-Warren that examines the life of Janis Joplin. The book has five "positive" reviews, eight "rave" reviews, and two "mixed" reviews, according to review aggregator Book Marks.

References

2019 non-fiction books
English-language books
Simon & Schuster books
Janis Joplin